The TL.37 was an Italian military artillery tractor of World War II. It was manufactured by SPA (Società Piemontese Automobili), an Italian car maker that was a subsidiary of Fiat.

Development and history

The tractor was chosen for the Royal Italian Army in 1938 as the result of a design competition between SPA and Breda Meccanica Bresciana for a light artillery tractor. It was subsequently used during World War 2 by all the Italian forces and was bought by Hungary. After the Italian Armistice in 1943, it continued to be used by German forces. Post–war, it was in service until 1948 with the Italian Navy.

The vehicle was notable for having four-wheel steering, that enabled it to have a  turning circle. It was also able to climb a 40-degree slope.

A self-propelled gun variant was also built, with a Cannone da 75/27 modello 11 fitted at the rear. The TL.37 was also the basis for a general–purpose truck, the Fiat–SPA AS.37, and two armoured cars the Fiat–SPA S37 (Fiat-SPA Autoprotetto S37) and the Fiat-SPA AS43.

Bibliography
 Gli Autoveicoli tattici E logistici del Regio Esercito Italiano fino Al 1943, tomo secondo, Stato Maggiore dell' Esercito, Ufficio Storico, Nicola Pignato & Filippo Cappellano, 2005
 Gli Autoveicoli del Regio Esercito nella Assisted Guerra Mondiale, Nicola Pignato, Storia Militare
 Dal TL 37 all ' A.S. 43, It trattore leggero, the autocarro sahariano, I derivati, artigliery, GMT, Nicola Pignato, Filippo Cappellano
 Trattore leggero SPA TL 37, Notiziario Modellistico GMT 2/91, Nicola Pignato (pp. 4–15)

External links
 TL-37 Tractor of Fiat SPA (Video)
 ASPHM SPA TL37 Trattore (Video)

World War II vehicles of Italy
Artillery tractors